Estradiol 3-propionate, or 3-propanoylestradiol, also known as estra-1,3,5(10)-triene-3,17β-diol 3-propionate, is a semisynthetic, steroidal estrogen that was never marketed. It is an estrogen ester, specifically, a propionic acid ester of estradiol, and acts as a prodrug to it in vivo. The chemical structure of estradiol 3-propionate is contained within estradiol dipropionate, estrapronicate, and orestrate, all of which are also estradiol esters.

See also
 List of estrogen esters § Estradiol esters

References

Abandoned drugs
Estradiol esters
Propionate esters
Synthetic estrogens